Núria Roig-Tost (born 19 April 1984) is a Spanish former professional tennis player.

A right-handed player from Reus, Roig reached a best singles ranking on the professional tour of 292 in the world. She played mostly on the ITF Circuit, where she won a total of seven titles, one in singles and six in doubles. Her only WTA Tour main draw appearance came at the 2005 Copa Colsanitas, where she partnered Laura Pous Tió in the doubles event.

ITF finals

Singles (1–4)

Doubles (6–5)

References

External links
 
 

1984 births
Living people
Spanish female tennis players
Tennis players from Catalonia
People from Reus
Sportspeople from the Province of Tarragona